The National Olympic and Sports Association of Iceland (abbreviated ÍSÍ) is the National Olympic Committee representing Iceland, and the highest authority for sporting activity in the country. The main tasks of the ÍSÍ are to promote, coordinate and organize sporting activities in Iceland, as well as to promote the development of sport, as well as public sport events. The ÍSÍ has organized many popular public annual sporting events such as marathons and cycle to work schemes.

History
ÍSÍ was founded on 28 January 1912 under the name Íþróttasamband Íslands (English: Sports Association of Iceland). In 1997 it merged with the Olympic Committee of Iceland (est. 1921) and was renamed as the National Olympic and Sports Association of Iceland.

List of presidents

Member federations 
The Icelandic National Federations are the organizations that coordinate all aspects of their individual sports. They are responsible for training, competition and development of their sports. There are currently 21 Olympic Summer and three Winter Sport Federations and four Non-Olympic Sports Federations in Iceland.

Olympic Sport federations

Non-Olympic Sport federations

See also
Iceland at the Olympics

References

External links
 Official website

Olympic
Iceland
Iceland at the Olympics
1921 establishments in Iceland